Norman Barasch (February 18, 1922 - August 13, 2019) was an American playwright, producer and screenwriter. He was co-author, with Carroll Moore, of the play Send Me No Flowers, which was the basis for the 1964 film of the same name. Barasch died in August 2019 at his home in Greenwich, Connecticut, at the age of 97.

References

External links

1922 births
2019 deaths
Television producers from New York (state)
Screenwriters from New York (state)
American dramatists and playwrights
American comedy writers
American male screenwriters
American television writers
American male television writers
20th-century American screenwriters